Swargam Narakam is a 1975 Telugu-language romantic drama film written and directed by Dasari Narayana Rao. The debut film for Mohan Babu and Annapoorna, the film was later remade in Bollywood as Swarg Narak (1978), and in Tamil as Sorgam Naragam. The film has garnered the Nandi Award for Best Feature Film.

Plot
The plot revolves around three couples. The first couple is that of Acharya (Dasari Narayana Rao), who always takes advantage of other's mistakes and position and earns money with his wife Mary. The second one is that of an Annapurna (Annapoorna) and playboy Mohan (Mohan Babu), while the jealous and possessive Jaya (Jayalakshmi) and Vikram (Eswara Rao) form the third one.

The first couple is happily married one. The second couple stays with Mohan's mother. Mohan spends a lot of time attending late night parties, while Annapurna patiently awaits her husband every night. Once Jaya happens to see Vicky with Radha, assumes they have an affair and pesters Vicky about it. When Vicky denies it, she leaves him. On the other hand, Mohan decides to leave the house, but destiny plays its role. He meets with an accident and during his recovery period, Annapurna proves how important she is for him. He repents and completely changes into a new soft-spoken and good man. On the other hand, Jaya spoils her own house to such a state that Vicky is compelled to leave his house after Radha's tragic suicide. At this juncture, Acharya steps in to mend the couple. Some of the events that follow is a hilarious sequence. Whether Acharya is successful in mending these couples forms the rest of the story.

Cast
 Mohan Babu as Mohan
 Annapoorna as Annapoorna 
 Dasari Narayana Rao  as  S. K. Acharya
 Jayalakshmi as Jayalakshmi
 Eswara Rao as Eswara Rao

Soundtrack

 "Mantallo Mantallo" (Lyrics: C. Narayana Reddy; Singer: S. P. Balasubrahmanyam)

Awards
 The film won Nandi Award for Third Best Feature Film - Bronze (1975)

References

External links
 

1975 films
1970s feminist films
1975 romantic drama films
Indian feminist films
Films about women in India
Indian romantic drama films
Films directed by Dasari Narayana Rao
Films scored by Satyam (composer)
Telugu films remade in other languages
1970s Telugu-language films
Films set in Vijayawada
Films shot in Vijayawada